The 2014 Missouri State Auditor election was held on November 4, 2014, to elect the State Auditor of Missouri, concurrently with other state and federal elections. 

Incumbent Republican State Auditor Tom Schweich ran for re-election to a second term in office. Facing only token opposition, Schweich won in a landslide, carrying every county. , this was the last time the counties of Jackson and St. Louis were won by the Republican candidate.

Republican primary

Candidates

Declared
 Tom Schweich, incumbent state auditor

Democratic primary

Candidates

Withdrew
 Jay Swearingen, state representative

Declined
 Barry Aycock, businessman
 Judy Baker, former state representative, nominee for Missouri's 9th congressional district in 2008 and candidate for Lieutenant Governor of Missouri in 2012
 Courtney Curtis, state representative
 Gregory F.X. Daly, St. Louis Collector of Revenue
 Keith English, state representative
 Vicki Englund, state representative
 Darlene Green, St. Louis Comptroller
 Timothy P. Green, former state senator
 Jason Holsman, state senator
 Tishaura Jones, St. Louis Treasurer and former state representative
 Jeremy LaFaver, state representative
 Ryan McKenna, state senator
 Adam Paul, Mayor of Ellisville
 Scott Sifton, state senator
 Francis G. Slay, Mayor of St. Louis
 Steve Stenger, St. Louis County Councilman (elected St. Louis County Executive)
 Stephen Webber, state representative
 John Wright, state representative
 Clint Zweifel, State Treasurer of Missouri

Third parties

Candidates

Declared
 Rodney Farthing (Constitution Party), minister, development director for ARM Prison Outreach and nominee for state treasurer in 2008
 Sean O'Toole (Libertarian Party), software developer, former agriculture commodities trader, nominee for the state house in 2010 and for state treasurer in 2012

General election

Results

See also
2014 United States elections

References

External links
Elections from the Missouri Secretary of State

2014 Missouri elections
Missouri State Auditor elections
November 2014 events in the United States
Missouri